Şahinde Hanım (born Princess Kezban Marshania;  1895 – 15 March 1924) was an Abkhazian princess. She was a lady-in-waiting to Nazikeda Kadın, wife of Mehmed VI, the last Sultan of the Ottoman Empire.

Life
Şahinde Hanım was born in 1895 in Sivas. Born as Kezban, she was a member of Abkhazian princely family, Marshania. Her father was Prince Abdülkadir Hasan Bey Marshania, (1862 - 1917) an office in the Ottoman army whose family had migrated from the Caucasus, and her mother was Princess Mevlüde İnal-lpa (1862 - 1937), also an Abkhazian. She had three brothers, Ismail Bey, Ali Bey, and Reşid Bey, and two sisters, Pakize who had been renamed Mislimelek Hanım (1883 - 1955), and Hatice who had been renamed Aşubican Hanım (1891 - 1955).

At a young age, she and her sister were sent to Istanbul to their aunt Nazikeda Kadın, who had been married to then Şehzade Vahideddin (future Sultan Mehmed VI). Here her name according to the custom of the Ottoman court was changed to Şahinde. She and her sister went onto serve Nazikeda as ladies-in-waiting to her. Sometime later her sister married, and left the palace, while she didn't marry, and continued to serve Nazikeda as second lady-in-waiting.

When Sultan Mehmed was deposed, he went into exile on 17 November 1922, leaving his family behind in Istanbul. During this time the revolutionaries closed Nazikeda along with her ladies-in-waiting, including Şahinde in the Feriye Palace. After Nazikeda also went into exile on 10 March 1924, Şahinde stayed in Istanbul. She was eventually acquitted by the Turkish Parliament. On the day of her release Şahinde was stabbed by a fanatical revolutionary in the street, and died a short time later in because of her serious injury on 15 March 1924 in Istanbul. She was buried in Eyüp cemetery.

Ancestry

See also
Rumeysa Aredba
Leyla Achba

References

Sources

1890s births
1924 deaths
Georgians from the Ottoman Empire
People from the Ottoman Empire of Abkhazian descent
Ladies-in-waiting of the Ottoman Empire